The 1975–76 Weber State Wildcats men's basketball team represented Weber State College during the 1975–76 NCAA Division I basketball season. Members of the Big Sky Conference, the Wildcats were led by first-year head coach Neil McCarthy and played their home games on campus at Wildcat Gym in Ogden, Utah.

This was McCarthy's first full season as head coach; he had been promoted in the middle of the previous season, following the sudden resignation of Gene Visscher in late January.

The Wildcats were regular season co-champions with Idaho State and Boise State, and the league champion hosted the new conference tournament. The seeding of the three co-champions for the four-team bracket was done by a random draw in late February, conducted via a Saturday night conference telephone call by commissioner John Roning from Moscow, Idaho.

Weber was drawn as the top seed, which included the right to host at Wildcat Gym in Ogden. At this time, both Weber and Boise still played in small gymnasiums, while ISU's Minidome had more than double the seating capacity of the others.

The Wildcats defeated fourth-seeded Northern Arizona in the semifinal, but lost to Boise State in the final in double overtime.

For the third consecutive year, senior forward Jimmie Watts was named to the all-conference team, this time as a unanimous choice. Senior center Al DeWitt was on the second team, and senior forward Paul Marigney was honorable mention.

Postseason results

|-
!colspan=5 style=| Big Sky tournament

References

External links
Sports Reference – Weber State Wildcats: 1975–76 basketball season

Weber State Wildcats men's basketball seasons
Weber State